Bapulal Malviya  was an Indian politician. He was elected to the Lok Sabha, the lower house of the Parliament of India  as a member of the Indian National Congress.

References

External links
Official biographical sketch in Parliament of India website

Indian National Congress politicians
Lok Sabha members from Madhya Pradesh
1929 births
Living people
Indian National Congress politicians from Madhya Pradesh